Harpovoluta is a genus of sea snails, marine gastropod mollusks in the subfamily Cymbiinae  of the family Volutidae.

Species
Species within the genus Harpovoluta include:
 Harpovoluta charcoti (Lamy, 1910)
Species brought into synonymy
 Harpovoluta vanhoeffeni Thiele, 1912: synonym of Harpovoluta charcoti (Lamy, 1910)

References

 Dell, R. K. (1990). Antarctic Mollusca with special reference to the fauna of the Ross Sea. Bulletin of the Royal Society of New Zealand, Wellington 27: 1–31
 Bail, P.; Poppe, G.T. (2001). A conchological iconography: a taxonomic introduction of the recent Volutidae. ConchBooks, Hackenheim. 30 pp, 5 pl.

External links
 Thiele, Johannes. "Die antarktischen schnecken und muscheln." Deutsche Südpolar-Expedition (1901–1903) 13 (1912): 183-286

Volutidae
Monotypic gastropod genera